Simcha Friedman (1911, Střížov, Bohemia – 5 January 1990) was an Israeli rabbi, educator and politician who served as a member of the Knesset for the National Religious Party in two spells between 1969 and 1977.

Biography
Born in Driesendorf in Bohemia, Austria-Hungary (now Střížov in the Czech Republic) in 1911, Friedman moved to Nuremberg with his family at a young age. He studied at a rabbinical seminary and at the Humboldt University of Berlin. He taught at a Jewish school between 1935 and 1938, before making aliyah to Mandatory Palestine in 1939, where he taught at Mikveh Israel Agricultural school between 1939 and 1943. In 1943 he joined kibbutz Tirat Zvi, and began working as a teacher and headmaster within the Religious Kibbutz Movement education system. Between 1967 and 1967 he was an educational emissary to New York City, before returning to Israel to work as a religious high school supervisor in the Northern District.

In 1969 he was elected to the Knesset on the National Religious Party list. Although he lost his seat in the 1973 elections, he returned to the Knesset on 2 July 1975 as a replacement for the deceased Michael Hasani. In the same year he began lecturing in the Talmud department at Bar-Ilan University. He lost his seat in the 1977 elections, and died in 1990.

References

External links
 

1911 births
1990 deaths
People from České Budějovice District
People from the Kingdom of Bohemia
Czech Jews
National Religious Party politicians
20th-century German rabbis
Humboldt University of Berlin alumni
Jewish emigrants from Nazi Germany to Mandatory Palestine
Rabbis in Mandatory Palestine
Israeli rabbis
Israeli educators
Academic staff of Bar-Ilan University
Members of the 7th Knesset (1969–1974)
Members of the 8th Knesset (1974–1977)
Jewish Israeli politicians
Rabbinic members of the Knesset